This is a list of television shows set in Newcastle upon Tyne.

 55 Degrees North
 Auf Wiedersehen, Pet (some segments)
 Boy Meets Girl
 Breeze Block
 Byker Grove
 The Dumping Ground
 Finney
 Firm Friends
 Geordie Racer
 Geordie Shore
 Hebburn
 Inspector George Gently
 Lawless
 The Likely Lads
 Our Friends in the North
 The Paper Lads
 Quayside
 Spender
 Super Gran
Vera
 Whatever Happened to the Likely Lads?
 When the Boat Comes In
 Wire in the Blood

Newcastle upon Tyne

Television shows set in Newcastle upon Tyne
Television shows